Arkadyevka is a rural locality (a selo) and the administrative center of Arkadyevsky Selsoviet of Arkharinsky District, Amur Oblast, Russia. The population was 631 in 2018. There are 17 streets.

Geography 
Arkadyevka is located on the right bank of the Arkhara River, 5 km southeast of Arkhara (the district's administrative centre) by road. Arkhara is the nearest rural locality.

References 

Rural localities in Arkharinsky District